Natomas is a community in northwestern Sacramento, in the U.S. state of California.

North Natomas was historically an agricultural area on the floodplains of the Sacramento River, but grew quickly starting in the mid-1990s with extensive residential development, office park, and retail construction. South Natomas developed predominantly as residential subdivisions from 1950 to 1980, but in 1982, amended its community plan to permit 2.4 million square feet of new office parks along I-5.

As a major center of employment, retail and entertainment facilities, Natomas is recognized as one of Greater Sacramento's most important edge cities (suburban economic centers) by Joel Garreau, who popularized the term. Natomas is generally defined as south of the Sacramento County line, north of the Garden Highway and the American River, west of the Natomas East Main Drain, and east of the Sacramento River. The neighborhood school district is Natomas Unified School District.

Major features
ARCO Arena is the major feature of the Natomas area of Sacramento previous home of the Sacramento Kings. The Sacramento International Airport is within the bounds of Natomas as defined by Sacramento County, but it is several miles away from the largely populated area of Natomas. Natomas is the closest portion of the city to the airport. Thus, there are many hotels located throughout the Natomas area. Natomas is a historical flood plain and is therefore subject to flooding. Another feature of this area is the ease of access to Interstate 5, Interstate 80, and the northern portion of Highway 99's route through Sacramento, making it a desirable living area for workers who commute.

Natomas is also home to a variety of outdoor spaces, including bike trails and parks. One of the newest additions is North Natomas Regional Park. Although it is being completed in phases, it is home to a water spray area for kids, grassy fields, playgrounds, ball fields, picnic areas, two dog parks (one for little and another for big dogs), asphalt and concrete paths for walking and riding, and a permanent farmers' market structure. Jackrabbits, birds of prey, and other wildlife romp in the undeveloped fields adjacent to the developed portions.

Government
Natomas is represented by Lisa Kaplan, the District 1 representative on the Sacramento City Council,  and Karina Talamantes, the District 3 representative on the Sacramento City Council as well as by Phil Serna, the District 1 representative on the Sacramento County Board of Supervisors.

The Natomas Basin Conservancy serves as plan operator for the Natomas Basin Habitat Conservation Plan. It acquires and manages habitat land for the benefit of the 22 special status species covered under the plan.

Economy
Natomas is a retail and entertainment hub for the metropolitan area, including The Promenade, anchored by Target, Best Buy, Michaels, TJ Maxx, and Burlington, Natomas Marketplace, anchored by Walmart and Home Depot, the Park Place 2 Shopping Center, and more. Northgate Blvd. is home to further retail businesses and hotels. Natomas is considered, by Joel Garreau who popularized the idea, to be one of the major edge cities, i.e. suburban economic centers, in Greater Sacramento.

Education

Most of the Natomas region is served by the Natomas Unified School District. Small portions are served by Twin Rivers Unified School District.

In South Natomas, elementary schools include American Lakes K-8, Jefferson K-8, Bannon Creek K-8, and Two Rivers Elementary. The main high school is Natomas High School.

In North Natomas, elementary schools on include Natomas Park Elementary (established 2000), Witter Ranch Elementary (established 2004), Heron K-8 (established 2006), H. Allen Hight Elementary (established 2008), and Paso Verde K-8 (established 2017). Natomas Middle School is the traditional middle school and Inderkum High School is the main high school.

Charter schools are a very popular option. Firstly, the district runs a dependent charter school in Southwest Natomas named Leroy Greene Academy, a 6–12 college preparatory secondary school. Independent charter school options include the Star Academy (K-5), Leading Edge Middle School (6-8) and Performing Fine Arts Academy (6–12) which are all part of the Natomas Charter School. Star Academy is located on its own campus in Natomas Crossing while the other schools are located at the main Natomas Charter Campus in Natomas Park. There is also Westlake Charter School (K-8) which is moving to a new campus in Natomas Park in 2017 and Natomas Pacific Pathways Prep Academy (K-12, college prep). NP3 K–5 is located in a temporary location on Commerce Way near the old Sleep Train Arena while the middle school and high school portion are located on Del Paso Road.

The Northgate region of South Natomas is served by Twin Rivers Unified School District. Students in these areas are assigned to Grant Union High School in Del Paso Heights. There is also a small portion of North Natomas served by Twin Rivers Unified School District. The elementary school is Regency Park Elementary School. The assigned middle school is Norwood (in the Robla area) and Rio Linda High School but many students do not attend those assigned schools and opt for either NUSD schools or for charter schools.

Notable residents

With the development of Natomas in the 1990s and 2000s, it became a very popular spot for legislators to buy second residences during the real estate boom of the early twenty-first century. Two reasons for its popularity were its relative affordability and proximity to the capitol.

Current
 Heather Fargo, former Mayor of Sacramento (South Natomas)
 Brian Maienschein State Assemblyman from San Diego (Natomas Crossing)
 Richard Pan, medical doctor and first assemblyman elected to actually have a permanent residence in Natomas area (Natomas Park)
 Blanca Rubio, State Assemblywoman from Baldwin Park (Natomas Park)
 Susan Rubio, State Senator from Baldwin Park (Westlake)

Former
Karen Bass, Congresswoman, and former Speaker of the Assembly from Los Angeles (South Natomas)
John J. Benoit, California State Senator from Palm Desert (Willowcreek)
Mike Bibby, former NY Knicks and Sacramento Kings point guard owned 2 different homes (Westlake)
John B. T. Campbell III, Congressman from Newport Beach, he lived in Natomas while he served in the state legislature. (Sundance Lake). 
Dave Cogdill, former Senate Minority leader lived in a house in North Natomas
Joe Coto, State Assemblyman from San Jose and former Superintendent of Schools in Oakland (South Natomas)
DeMarcus Cousins, former Sacramento Kings basketball player and all-star center, lived in the Westlake neighborhood of North Natomas.
 Robert Dutton, California State Senator from Rancho Cucamonga (Heritage Park)
Michael D. Duvall, former California State Assemblyman from Yorba Linda lived in a house in the Gateway West neighborhood
 Alexander Gonzalez, president at Sacramento State University (Westlake)
Tom Harman, former State Assemblyman, State Senator and Attorney General Candidate owned three houses in the Willowcreek neighborhood.
 Jerry Hill, California State Assemblyman from San Mateo (Willowcreek)
Shirley Horton, Assemblywoman from San Diego (Willowcreek)
 Bob Huff, California State Senator from Diamond Bar (Gateway West)
Jay LaSuer, Republican Assemblyman from San Diego co-owned a house with Assemblyman Dennis Mountjoy in the Willowcreek neighborhood.
Rush Limbaugh, Conservative Commentator used to live in South Natomas
Kevin Martin, Houston Rockets player (eventually moved to Midtown)
Dennis Mountjoy – former Republican Assemblyman from Monrovia co-owned a house with Assemblyman Jay LaSuer in the Willowcreek neighborhood.
Eric Musselman, former Sacramento Kings head coach
Kenny Natt, former Sacramento Kings head coach (Westlake neighborhood)
 Jose Solorio, State Assembly member from Santa Ana (Willowcreek)
 Cameron Smyth, State Assembly member from Santa Clarita (Regency Park)
 Beno Udrih, former Sacramento Kings basketball player (Gateway West)
Corliss Williamson, retired Sacramento Kings basketball player
Eric The Actor, Wack Packer from the Howard Stern Show

References

External links

Natomas Unified School District
North Natomas Public Library
North Natomas Transportation Management Association
Reclamation District 1000
South Natomas Public Library
South Natomas Transportation Management Association
The Natomas Buzz

Populated places in the Sacramento metropolitan area
Neighborhoods in Sacramento, California
Edge cities in the United States